Hamlett "Ham" S. Harmon (April 2, 1913 – January 1, 1997) was an American professional football player for the Chicago Cardinals of the NFL. He played a total of six games.

Awards and honors
Tulsa Golden Hurricane team captain (1936)
Tulsa University Athletic Hall of Fame (inducted in 1986)

Personal life
Harmon is Elise Harmon's brother.

References

1913 births
1997 deaths
American football centers
Chicago Cardinals players
Tulsa Golden Hurricane football players
People from Freestone County, Texas
Players of American football from Texas